Jung Eun-pyo (born March 27, 1966) is a South Korean actor. He is active in both stage and screen since 1990, notably in the film Kilimanjaro (for which he won Best Supporting Actor at the Grand Bell Awards) and the television dramas Moon Embracing the Sun and God's Gift - 14 Days.

Filmography

Film

Television series

Web series

Variety show

Music video

Theater

Awards and nominations

References

External links 
 
 
 
 

1966 births
Living people
South Korean male film actors
South Korean male television actors
South Korean male stage actors
Seoul Institute of the Arts alumni